= CZJ =

CZJ may refer to:

- Catherine Zeta-Jones (born 1969), Welsh actress
- FC Carl Zeiss Jena, German football club
- Carl Zeiss Jena (company), German optics company
